Barger-Oosterveen is a hamlet in the Netherlands and is part of the Emmen municipality in Drenthe.

Barger-Oosterveen is a statistical entity, however the postal authorities have placed it under Klazienaveen. It was first mentioned in 1867 as Ooster Veen, and means "The eastern bog near Barge".

References 

Populated places in Drenthe
Emmen, Netherlands